"When I'm Gone" is a 1981 single by English soft rock musician Albert Hammond, taken from his 1981 album, Your World and My World. It charted in Germany at No. 50, Switzerland at No. 12, and in South Africa at No. 7.

Rockell version

"When I'm Gone" was covered by freestyle singer Rockell in 1999, as her fourth overall single and last single off her 1998 debut album, What Are You Lookin' At?.

Lyrics and background
The meaning of the song is about when she's gone, will the guy miss her as she misses him. She can't stop thinking of him and wants to reconcile with him. She wanted to be apart at first but hopes love will reunite them. The beat of the song is cheery and uptempo.

Track listing
US CD single

Chart positions

References

1981 songs
1981 singles
Albert Hammond songs
1999 singles
Rockell songs
CBS Records singles
Songs written by Albert Hammond